The Milton Ulladulla Times is an English language newspaper published in Ulladulla, New South Wales, Australia.  It is printed and published by Paul Poulus for the Milton-Ulladulla Publishing Co. Pty. Ltd.

History 
The Milton Ulladulla Times is a weekly publication.  The publication began as the Ulladulla and Milton Times in 1878 and remained with this title until 1969. It emerged again in 1978 as the Milton Ulladulla Times. The original paper consisted primarily of advertising and community news.

It also absorbed the Milton Ulladulla Express, which was first published in 1981 in Nowra, New South Wales. From 1981 to 1988 it was published as the Milton-Ulladulla on the Premier Coast Express and from 1991, until absorbed by the Times in 1998, as the Milton Ulladulla Express.

Digitisation 
The various versions of the paper have been digitised as part of the Australian Newspapers Digitisation Program project hosted by the National Library of Australia.

See also 
 List of newspapers in New South Wales

References

Bibliography 
 Holden, W Sprague 1961, Australia goes to press, Melbourne University Press, Melbourne.
 Mayer, Henry 1964, The press in Australia, Lansdowne Press, Melbourne.
 Walker, R B 1976, The newspaper press in New South Wales 1803-1920, Sydney University Press, Sydney.

External links 
 
 

1878 establishments in Australia
1969 disestablishments in Australia
1978 establishments in Australia
Newspapers published in New South Wales
Publications disestablished in 1969
Publications established in 1878
Publications established in 1978
Weekly newspapers published in Australia
Newspapers on Trove